Bodybuilding in France dates to . The country has a national federation that is a member of the European Bodybuilding and Fitness Federation and the International Federation of Bodybuilding and Fitness.

History 
The tradition of muscle building in France in 1847 with the opening of Gymnase Triat. Monique Berlioux was an early supporter of the IFBB in France.

Governance 
France has an organization that is a member of the European Bodybuilding and Fitness Federation. The country has a national organization that is a recognized by the International Federation of Bodybuilding and Fitness as a national federation, representing the country's bodybuilding community.

References